Mesophantia is a genus of planthoppers in the family Flatidae, established by Leopold Melichar in 1902.

Species
 Mesophantia kanganica Dlabola, 1983
 Mesophantia pallens Melichar, 1902
 Mesophantia sabzevaranica Dlabola, 1983
 Mesophantia tisina Dlabola, 1983

References 

Flatidae